In mathematics, exactness may refer to:

 Exact category
 Exact functor
 Landweber exact functor theorem
 Exact sequence

See also
 Exactness of measurements
 Accuracy and precision